East Millstone is an unincorporated community and census-designated place (CDP) located in Franklin Township in Somerset County, New Jersey. 

As of the 2010 U.S. census, the CDP's population was 579. It is a small rural community that grew and prospered with a small industrial base in the 19th Century, centered on the Delaware and Raritan Canal at Amwell Road and the long-abandoned Millstone and New Brunswick Railroad that terminated in East Millstone. East Millstone was an independent municipality from 1873–1949. The East Millstone Historic District was listed on the National Register of Historic Places in 1983.

History
East Millstone existed as an independent municipality for more than 75 years. It was incorporated as a town by an act of the New Jersey Legislature on February 18, 1873, from portions of Franklin Township, and existed on its own until December 31, 1949, when it was returned to Franklin Township. The residents voted 119–28 in favor of dissolution on March 9, 1949.

The independent municipality of Millstone, New Jersey, a borough which is not part of Franklin Township, is located across the Millstone River, which is directly west of the Delaware and Raritan Canal.

East Millstone maintains its rural character into the 21st Century, with a firehouse, a post office and just a handful of local businesses.  The housing stock is also quite old, with no new development in the East Millstone section of Franklin Township in recent years.

Historic district

The East Millstone Historic District is a historic district encompassing the village. It was added to the National Register of Historic Places on March 17, 1983 for its significance in architecture, commerce, industry, and transportation. It includes 109 contributing buildings. The Franklin Inn, historically known as the Van Liew Farmhouse, is among the oldest houses in the village.

Geography
According to the U.S. Census Bureau, East Millstone had a total area of 2.296 square miles (5.946 km2), including 2.234 square miles (5.785 km2) of land and 0.062 square miles (0.161 km2) of water (2.70%).

Demographics

Census 2010

Gallery

References

External links
 

Census-designated places in Somerset County, New Jersey
Former municipalities in Somerset County, New Jersey
Former towns in New Jersey
Franklin Township, Somerset County, New Jersey
National Register of Historic Places in Somerset County, New Jersey
Historic districts on the National Register of Historic Places in New Jersey
New Jersey Register of Historic Places